Hammenhög is a locality situated in Simrishamn Municipality, Skåne County, Sweden with 908 inhabitants in 2010.

The village is named after a Bronze-Age grave, the first part of the name, Hammen-, refers to a person named Haming or Hamund, the second part, -hög, from the Old Norse word Haugr, means mound or barrow.

References

External links 
 Hammenhog.com

Populated places in Skåne County
Populated places in Simrishamn Municipality